Fightmag (stylized as FIGHTMAG)  is a news website (online magazine) that covers combat sports internationally, such as boxing, kickboxing, mixed martial arts and Muay Thai, as well as bare knuckle fighting and professional wrestling. It publishes pieces including news, video, opinion, reviews, events and blogs.

Overview 

Fightmag was launched in August 2005 and was originally oriented for Francophonie. In a year time it evolved internationally and the publishing started in two languages, English and French. Since 2009 Fightmag has been based in Australia and published in English.

In 2015 Fightmag marked the date of its tenth anniversary. In October 2016 FIGHTMAG was described in FightBox as "a leading online fight magazine out of Australia".

Fightmag has been cited in various publications and public media, including Talksport, Maxim, CNN Indonesia, The Punch, International Business Times, DAZN, Manchester Evening News, Чемпионат, Nur.kz, Morocco World News, Sportskeeda, Daily Express, Sindonews.com, EssentiallySports, Boxing Scene, Net.hr, The West Australian, GiveMeSport, Tribunnews.com, Iltalehti, Akurat.co, Tribuna, among others.

As an affiliate, Fightmag has been partnered with such networks as: ESPN+, DAZN, Showtime, Sky Sports, FITE TV, BT Sport, among others.

Authors 

The team of authors at Fightmag has included former multi-weight world champion in Muay Thai Nathan Corbett, who has been a regular contributor after retiring from fighting. As well, the first Australian model to partake in Muay Thai bouts Lilian Dikmans, who has shared her experience in combat sports. Former Muay Thai fighter and WKN Australian super lightweight title challenger Parviz Iskenderov, who has also been an editor of publication.

Structure 

There have been eight types of Fightmag stories, such as: news, videos, blogs, entertainment, beauty, fitness, lifestyle and press releases.

In 2020 Fightmag launched the Fight Schedule website, featuring the list of upcoming combat sports events and event information.

See also

Black Belt (magazine)
DAZN
ESPN
MMA Fighting
MMAjunkie.com
Sherdog
Showtime
The Ring (magazine)

References

External links
 
 

Australian sport websites
Australian news websites
Sports magazines published in Australia
Boxing magazines
Internet properties established in 2005
Martial arts magazines
Boxing websites
Mixed martial arts websites